Seydou Gbané (born 12 April 1992) is an Ivorian taekwondo practitioner.

He competed at the African Games both in 2015 and in 2019. He won the bronze medal in the men's -87 kg event at the 2015 African Games held in 
Brazzaville, Republic of the Congo. He also competed at the 2019 African Games held in Rabat, Morocco and he won the gold medal in the men's -87 kg event.

He also won the gold medal in the men's -87 kg event at the 2018 African Taekwondo Championships held in Agadir, Morocco. In 2019, he competed in the men's middleweight event at the World Taekwondo Championships held in Manchester, United Kingdom.

He competed at the 2020 Summer Olympics held Tokyo, Japan in the men's +80 kg weight class.

References

External links 
 

1992 births
Living people
Ivorian male taekwondo practitioners
African Games medalists in taekwondo
African Games gold medalists for Ivory Coast
African Games bronze medalists for Ivory Coast
Competitors at the 2015 African Games
Competitors at the 2019 African Games
Place of birth missing (living people)
African Taekwondo Championships medalists
Taekwondo practitioners at the 2020 Summer Olympics
Olympic taekwondo practitioners of Ivory Coast
21st-century Ivorian people